Ak Chut Vaya was a populated place on the Tohono Oʼodham Reservation, in Pima County. The settlement was located on the Tohono Oʼodham Indian Reservation. The Tohono Oʼodham name "Ak Chut Vaya" translates to "arroyo well" in English. As of 2019, the townsite consists of two abandoned buildings and can be classified as a ghost town.

References

Former populated places in Pima County, Arizona